Baccharis dioica is a North American species of shrubs in the family Asteraceae known by the common name broombush falsewillow. It is native to Florida, the Yucatán Peninsula, and the West Indies (Bahamas, Greater Antilles, Virgin Islands, Montserrat).

Baccharis dioica is a shrub sometimes as much as 300 cm (10 feet) tall. It grows in hammocks, on dunes, and in mangrove swamps.

References

dioica
Plants described in 1794
Taxa named by Martin Vahl
Flora of Southeastern Mexico
Flora of the Caribbean
Flora of Florida
Flora without expected TNC conservation status